Into the Sun is a 2005 action film directed by Christopher Morrison and starring Steven Seagal (who also produced), Matthew Davis, Takao Osawa, Eddie George, Juliette Marquis, and William Atherton.

The original script, written by Trevor Miller, was very similar to Sydney Pollack's The Yakuza. Joe Halpin, a former undercover narcotics detective, rewrote the script with Seagal to avoid making it a costly remake. Set in Japan, Seagal plays a CIA operative who takes down Yakuza gangsters. It was theatrically released in Japan but only went direct-to-DVD in the United States.

Plot 
The assassination of Tokyo's governor Takayama causes a stir of public outrage in Tokyo, Japan. Upon hearing news of the incident, the U.S. FBI asks the CIA's Tokyo office to investigate the killing, believing it to be linked to the Yakuza, a dangerous Japanese mafia syndicate. The Japanese branch of the CIA starts sniffing around under the auspices of the United States Department of Homeland Security. CIA agent Travis Hunter and his rookie FBI agent understudy Sean Mac are assigned to work on the case and to track down the perpetrators. During their work, Mac proves to be primarily a distraction to Hunter, especially as he is neither very knowledgeable about CIA procedures nor Japanese customs. Hunter, on the other hand, having been raised in Japan, has a strong understanding of the Yakuza and their mysterious, eccentric and sinister ways.

Hunter and Mac discover a plan by Kuroda, the boss of a new Yakuza outfit, to build an enormous drug-dealing network using his export company in cahoots with a Chinese Triad outfit leader named Chen. Kuroda is killing everyone who gets in his way. While reviewing security footage of the assassination, Hunter identifies a medallion seen around the neck of the shooter that links Kuroda to be the mastermind of the governor's assassination. As Hunter has been told that Kojima, the second-in-command of an old school Yakuza group run by elderly 'godfather' Oyabun Ishikawa, is the only Yakuza player who is capable of defeating Kuroda, Hunter turns to him for help. When they speak, Kojima tells Hunter that the new Yakuza have gained more power after joining forces with the Triads, and are ready to eliminate any other Yakuza gang. Kojima then reveals and he and Hunter have something in common - permanently ridding of Kuroda, adding that it will be interesting to see which one of them kills him first.

Meanwhile, Hunter's relentless pursuit of Kuroda increasingly endangers those associated with him. First, Kuroda has godfather Ishikawa murdered, making Kojima the new leader of Ishikawa's Yakuza outfit. Mac gets out of his depth while investigating and is also brutally murdered. But when Kuroda has Hunter's fiancée Nayako savagely slaughtered by sword, Hunter's search for Kuroda becomes devastatingly personal. Teaming up with CIA operative Jewel and tattoo artist Fudomyo-o, whose wife and young child were also killed by Kuroda, Hunter sets out to take down Kuroda.

By nightfall, Fudomyo-o and Hunter arrive at the temple Kuroda uses as his hideout. One-by-one they take on all the members of Kuroda's group with katanas. Mei Ling, former student of Hunter and daughter of his sifu, who was killed by Chen, also arrives just in time to save Fudomyo-o and then teams up with the two men. After Fudomyo-o survives being shot during a confrontation Kuroda. Hunter then appears and ferociously battles Kuroda, ultimately killing him by slashing his chest. They then leave Kuroda's temple hideout.

The next day, Mei Ling, Fudomyo-o and Hunter hold a memorial service to offer their respects to Nayako. At the same time, a Yakuza ceremony is held to formally make Kojima the successor leader. Jewel and her CIA "professional cleaning company crew" arrive at Kuroda's hideout and quickly coat virtually everything with a gooey blue substance. The local authorities arrive shortly thereafter to investigate the scene, and are puzzled by what they find. They take the bodies of Kuroda and his henchmen for autopsy as the weapons are collected for forensic criminal investigation. As the chief inspector comments that the blue goo will keep them from gathering fingerprints, Hunter returns to the park where he and Nayako used to hang out in order to grieve and remember her.

Cast
 Steven Seagal as CIA Agent Travis Hunter, a law enforcement agent sent to Tokyo to track down a crime syndicate responsible for murdering the governor
 Matthew Davis as FBI Agent Sean Mac, Hunter's rookie understudy
 Takao Osawa as Kuroda (Japanese: 黒田, Kuroda), the leader of the crime syndicate responsible for assassinating Tokyo's Governor and the main antagonist.
 Eddie George as CIA Agent Jones, Travis' ex-partner who is killed in South East Asia. 
 William Atherton as CIA Agent Block: The head of the CIA stationed in Tokyo.
 Juliette Marquis as Jewel, a CIA spook.
 Ken Lo as Chen (Mandarin: 陈, Chén), a Triad boss who plans to make the Triads and Yakuza one unstoppable criminal organization.
 Kosuke Toyohara as Fudomyo-o (Japanese: 不動明王, Fudōmyōō): A tattoo artist whose wife and child was killed by Kuroda.
 Akira Terao as Matsuda (Japanese: 松田, Matsuda), the elder boss of the Yakuza. 
 Dale Payne as Zen Custodian
 Eve Masatoh as Kojima (Japanese: 小島, Kojima), an old-school Yakuza underboss who has knowledge of Kuroda's illegal activities and plans.
 Pace Wu as Mai Ling (Mandarin: 麦玲, Mài líng), a protege of Travis.
 Chiaki Kuriyama as Ayako, the daughter of the Governor who was assassinated by Kuroda's men.
 Kanako Yamaguchi as Nayako (Japanese: なやこ, Nayako), Travis' Japanese fiancé' who is murdered by one of the Yakuza mafia members
 Namihiko Ohmura as Takeshi (Japanese: たけし, Takeshi), one of Kuroda’s lieutenants who wears glasses and is seen with Kawamura.
 Daisuke Honda as Kawamura (Japanese: 川村, Kawamura), one of Kuroda’s lieutenants wearing a cowboy hat.
 Roy Oguri as Kenji (Japanese, 賢司, Kenji)
 Sokyu Fujita as Investigator Maeda (Japanese: 前田捜査官, Maeda sōsa-kan)
 Vikrom Suebsaeng as Chang Choudong (Mandarin, 张崇东, Zhāngchóngdōng), a Chinese-Thai triad member based in Bangkok.
 Shôji Oki as Ishikawa (Japanese, 石川県, Ishikawa ken), the mob boss of an old-school Yakuza organization who bears hatred for Kuroda.

Production 
The original script by Trevor Miller had to be reworked, as it was too similar to The Yakuza, which would have cost too much to license for a remake. The film was announced in 2003 after Franchise Pictures bought the script. Joe Halpin, who rewrote the script, is a former undercover narcotics detective who worked with the Los Angeles County Sheriff's Department and Drug Enforcement Administration. Morrison said that the film, which was shot in Japan, was designed to feel authentically Japanese instead of merely being an American film set in Japan. Seagal had lived in Japan earlier and expressed embarrassment in the DVD commentary over how rusty he was at the use of the Japanese language.

The director said his "experience with Steven was terrific. I was working on a project very near to his heart as it was set in Tokyo and Steven had lived there for years and speaks fluent Japanese. The only difficulties came from stretching the budget and schedule to work in Tokyo and Thailand with a multi-language speaking cast. I however am very grateful for him giving me the shot to work with him on such a personal project he wrote."

Release 
Sony released Into the Sun theatrically in Japan on November 26, 2005, and it grossed $164,762. In the United States, it went direct-to-video, released on February 15, 2005.

Reception 
Beyond Hollywood wrote that the film could have been good if it had starred someone besides Seagal, whose extensive scenes of dialogue feel like padding and do not play to his action hero strengths. Ian Jane of DVD Talk rated it 3/5 stars and, while calling it one of Seagal's better recent films, recommended it to fans of mindless action films.

References

Bibliography

External links 
 
 
Into the Sun at Letterbox DVD
Review of film at Vern

2005 films
2005 direct-to-video films
2005 action films
2005 martial arts films
American action films
American martial arts films
Japanese action films
Japanese martial arts films
2000s Japanese-language films
Direct-to-video action films
Films about the Federal Bureau of Investigation
Films about the Central Intelligence Agency
Films set in Tokyo
Films shot in Japan
Destination Films films
Triad films
Yakuza films
Franchise Pictures films
Films scored by Stanley Clarke
Films produced by Elie Samaha
Japan in non-Japanese culture
2000s English-language films
2000s American films
2000s Hong Kong films
2005 multilingual films
American multilingual films
Japanese multilingual films